Rezal Zambery Yahya (born 10 October 1978 in Batu Pahat, Johor) is a Malaysian former footballer who plays as a midfielder. He is former head coach for Kelantan in Malaysia Premier League.

Career
Rezal played in the Johor youth teams before making his senior debut in 1997. With Johor, he won Malaysia FA Cup in 1998 and Premier Two league title in 1999. He transferred to Kelantan FA in 2001, before coming back to Johor a year later to play with club side Johor FC.

He moved to Negeri Sembilan FA in 2005. In his 5 years with the team, he won Malaysia Cup in 2009 as well as runners-up in two occasions. Rezal signs with his former team Johor FC for one season in 2011, before switching to ATM FA in 2012, where he won 2012 Malaysia Premier League title with them.

He returned to Negeri Sembilan FA in 2015 .

Managerial statistics

References

External links
 
 Profile at Kelate dot Net
 Rezal pindah kerana keluarga

1978 births
Living people
Malaysian footballers
Malaysian people of Malay descent
Kelantan FA players
Negeri Sembilan FA players
Malaysia international footballers
People from Batu Pahat
People from Johor
Association football midfielders